Choola is a 1979 Indian Malayalam film, directed by J. Sasikumar. The film stars M. G. Soman, Manavalan Joseph, Bhavani, P. J. Antony and Sankaradi in the lead roles. The film has musical score by Raveendran, who debuted through this film, and later became an influential music director in Malayalam film industry.

Cast
 
M. G. Soman 
Bhavani 
Manavalan Joseph 
Maya 
P. J. Antony 
Sankaradi 
Sreelatha Namboothiri 
Cochin Haneefa 
Pappachan
Adoor Bhavani 
Baby Sumathi 
Cherthala Thankam
G. K. Pillai 
Kollam Venukumar
Kundara Venu 
Master Raghu 
Master Venu 
Master Manohar
Meena 
Padmanabhapilla
Stanley
Thodupuzha Radhakrishnan

Soundtrack
The music was composed by Raveendran.

References

External links
 

1979 films
1970s Malayalam-language films
Films directed by J. Sasikumar